Autonomous province is a term for a type of province that has administrative autonomy. In political history, the term has been used as designation for various types of autonomous entities, on medium levels of administrative hierarchy. In relative terms, an autonomous province usually has less autonomy than an autonomous state, but more autonomy than an autonomous region. Administrative autonomy of a province can be expressed in its official name, by the use of a particular term designating the autonomy, but such term can also be omitted. In that case, the autonomous status of a province can be determined on the basis of relevant legal provisions.

Occurrences

Finland 
In Finland, there is one autonomous province:

 Autonomous Province Åland

Italy

In Italy, there are two autonomous provinces:
 Autonomous Province of Trento 
 Autonomous Province of South Tyrol

Serbia

In Serbia, there are two autonomous provinces:
 Autonomous Province of Vojvodina
 Autonomous Province of Kosovo and Metohija

Former autonomous provinces
 Autonomous Province of Western Bosnia

See also 
 Province
 Autonomous territory

Literature 
 Aldo Stella, Storia dell'Autonomia trentina, Trento: Edizioni U.C.T, 1997.

References 

Types of administrative division